Enseigne de vaisseau Jacoubet (F794) is a  in the French Navy.

Design 

Armed by a crew of 90 sailors, these vessels have the reputation of being among the most difficult in bad weather. Their high windage makes them particularly sensitive to pitch and roll as soon as the sea is formed.

Their armament, consequent for a vessel of this tonnage, allows them to manage a large spectrum of missions. During the Cold War, they were primarily used to patrol the continental shelf of the Atlantic Ocean in search of Soviet Navy submarines. Due to the poor performance of the hull sonar, as soon as an echo appeared, the reinforcement of an ASM frigate was necessary to chase it using its towed variable depth sonar.

Their role as patrollers now consists mainly of patrols and assistance missions, as well as participation in UN missions (blockades, flag checks) or similar marine policing tasks (fight against drugs, extraction of nationals, fisheries control, etc.). The mer-mer 38 or mer-mer 40 missiles have been landed, but they carry several machine guns and machine guns, more suited to their new missions.

Its construction cost was estimated at 270,000,000 French francs.

Construction and career 
Enseigne de vaisseau Jacoubet was laid down in April 1979 at Arsenal de Lorient, Lorient. Launched on 29 September 1981 and commissioned on 23 October 1982.

In January 2013, during Operation Serval in Mali, the ship escorted a ro-ro vessel chartered by the French Navy, MN Eider, which was transporting equipment to Senegal.

In 2014, the ship participated in Operation Corymbe, off West Africa.

In May 2016, she participated in search operations for Flight 804 EgyptAir, which disappeared on 19 May 2016 in the eastern Mediterranean Sea.

On 15 February 2019, the vessel joined the European operation EU Navfor Med in order to fight against trafficking in the Mediterranean. He left the operation on March 14, after 28 days of engagement. Since her admission to active service, her code name is Jackhammer.

She was transferred from her home port of Toulon in July 2020 to Brest. In 2022, it was indicated that the ship would be equipped with the SMDM (navy mini-drone system) to enhance her surveillance capabilities.  She began a short upgrade in November 2022 (to continue until February 2023), in order to integrate the new system.

She is scheduled to be withdrawn from service in 2026 and be replaced by one of a new class of ocean-going Patrol Vessels (the Patrouilleurs Océanique).

Citations 

Ships built in Lorient
1981 ships
D'Estienne d'Orves-class avisos